Don Malone is an Australian former rugby league footballer who played in the 1950s and 1960s.  He played for Western Suburbs as a halfback but began his career as a winger.

Playing career

Malone started his first grade career with Western Suburbs in 1958.  In the same year he played on the wing in the 1958 grand final defeat against St George.  In 1959, Malone won the reserve grade competition with Wests.  Malone missed the 1961 grand final loss against St George but then played in the following two consecutive grand final losses both against St George who at that stage were halfway through their 11-year premiership reign.  Malone played a further two seasons for Wests and retired at the end of 1965.

References

Western Suburbs Magpies players
Rugby league halfbacks
Rugby league players from Sydney
Year of birth missing
Rugby league wingers